Cabella may refer to:

 Cabella Ligure, a comune in the Province of Alessandria in the Italian region Piedmont
 Cabella (surname), surname

See also 
 Cabello, a genus of spiders